The Cavallero House is a historic residence in Mobile, Alabama.  It was built in 1835 in the Federal style. A cast-iron gallery was added in the mid-19th century.  The house was added to the National Register of Historic Places on October 7, 1982.  In addition to be individually listed in the National Register, the house is also a contributing building to the Lower Dauphin Street Historic District.

References

National Register of Historic Places in Mobile, Alabama
Houses on the National Register of Historic Places in Alabama
Houses in Mobile, Alabama
Federal architecture in Alabama
Houses completed in 1835